Paul Sherman "Sherm" Cohen (born January 19, 1965) is an American storyboard artist, director, and writer. During college, Cohen worked as a cartoonist for his local newspaper.  He got his start in animation at Nickelodeon on The Ren and Stimpy Show as character layout artist, followed by a three-year stint on Hey Arnold! as storyboard artist and director.

Career
Cohen was a writer, artist, and letterer for Nickelodeon Magazine from 1996 until the magazine ceased operations in 2009. He contributed dozens of comic strips and cover art featuring Nicktoons characters.

In early 1998, Cohen was invited by Stephen Hillenburg to be part of the original SpongeBob SquarePants crew. Cohen spent the first season on the show as storyboard artist, writer, and director.  He then moved up to Storyboard Supervisor for the next three seasons of SpongeBob SquarePants. Cohen also wrote the "F.U.N." and "Texas" songs for the show.

Cohen was also lead storyboard artist and a character designer on The SpongeBob SquarePants Movie. Cohen described his time on SpongeBob to an interviewer by saying, "People often ask about what it was like working on SpongeBob, and it’s hard to give an answer that really captures the moment." He has a character named after him in the show.

After the fourth season, Cohen left Nickelodeon to write and illustrate his first book for Walter Foster Publications, "Cartooning: Character Design".

Cohen also began teaching classes in storyboarding at the Entertainment Art Academy in Pasadena, California. Some of this material was turned into an instructional DVD on how to storyboard called, "Storyboard Elements."
In December 2008, "Storyboard Elements" instructional DVD reached its 2nd edition and fourth pressing.

After working at Cartoon Network for a year, Cohen went to work at the Disney Television Animation, writing and drawing storyboards for Phineas and Ferb.
After Phineas and Ferb'''s first season, Cohen returned to Nickelodeon for the first season of The Mighty B! as storyboard artist.
In 2008, Cohen was back at Disney working on the second season of Phineas and Ferb as storyboard artist/writer.
During this time, he also wrote some songs for the show:  "X-Ray Eyes",  "Bubble Gum", and  "Aren’t You a Little Young?"

From 2009–2010, Cohen worked on Disney's Kick Buttowski: Suburban Daredevil as storyboard supervisor, story editor, and director.
In 2011, he received a nomination for a daytime Emmy Award for "Outstanding Directing in an Animated Program".

Cohen created "Storyboard Secrets", a comprehensive DVD/online guide to storyboarding.http://storyboardsecrets.com/blog

From 2010–2013, Cohen worked on Disney's Fish Hooks as storyboard supervisor. The pet store owner character "Bud" on the show is a photo collage version of Cohen.
He's also written the song "Earth Troll Rap" for the show.

During 2013–2014, Cohen worked on The SpongeBob Movie: Sponge Out of Water as sequence supervisor.

In January 2015, Cohen returned to work on the SpongeBob SquarePants show. His favorite SpongeBob'' character is Patrick Star.

Filmography

Film

Television

Bibliography

Notes

External links
 
 Sherm Cohen's blog, CartoonSNAP
 Sherm Cohen on deviantArt
 StoryboardSecrets.com
Sherm Cohen biography on Lambiek

The Kubert School alumni
American male screenwriters
American storyboard artists
American male television writers
American television writers
Writers from Los Angeles
American television directors
Living people
1965 births
American comics artists
Screenwriters from California